The International Journal of High Performance Computing Applications is a quarterly peer-reviewed scientific journal covering the field of computer science. Its editors-in-chief are Jack J. Dongarra (University of Tennessee) and Bronis R. De Supinski (Lawrence Livermore National Laboratory). It was established in 1987 and is published by SAGE Publications.

Abstracting and indexing 
The journal is abstracted and indexed in Academic Search Premier, Mechanical & Transportation Engineering Abstracts, Current Contents, Scopus, and the Science Citation Index Expanded. According to the Journal Citation Reports, its 2023 impact factor is 2.820.

References

External links 
 

SAGE Publishing academic journals
English-language journals
Publications established in 1987
Computer science journals
Quarterly journals